Duda Salabert Rosa (born 2 May 1981) is a Brazilian politician, environmentalist, and teacher. In 2020, she became the first transgender person to serve on the city council of Belo Horizonte after campaigning as a Democratic Labour Party candidate. She was elected with over 37,000 votes, more than any city council candidate in the history of Minas Gerais at the time.

Since 2023, she's representing the state of Minas Gerais as a federal deputy.

Personal life 
Salabert began working as a teacher in 2002. She cofounded Transvest, a non-governmental organization focused on combating transphobia.

Duda is a lesbian, married with Raíssa. In 2019, they had a child and chose a gender-neutral name for them.

Political activity 
In 2018, Salabert campaigned as a Socialism and Liberty Party candidate to represent the state of Minas Gerais in the Brazilian Senate. Salabert said that she had received invitations to campaign for other offices, but that she chose the Senate as a form of provocation, noting that the etymology of the term senate relates to men and that "if it is a space made for gentlemen, a travesti woman seeking this space is extremely provocative". She additionally stated that she had been targeted on social media and that she feared escalation to physical violence. She was 36 years old at the time. Salabert received more than 350,000 votes, not winning the election but becoming the first transgender person to run for the Brazilian Senate.

In April 2019, Salabert left the Socialism and Liberty Party, criticizing the party for "structural transphobia" and anthropocentrism.

In 2020, Salabert was elected to the city council of Belo Horizonte after campaigning as a member of the Democratic Labour Party. She was the first transgender person elected to the Belo Horizonte city council, and with 37,000 votes in support, the most-voted-for city council candidate in Minas Gerais history at the time. In December 2020, the school where Salabert taught received an email threatening both her and the school if she remained in her position, and she was fired.

In June 2021, Salabert announced that she would campaign for a Senate seat in 2022. She had previously pledged to serve for her entire 4-year term on the Belo Horizonte city council, but stated that she had been advised by the United Nations and the Inter-American Commission on Human Rights to seek a position in the federal government so that she could be protected by the Polícia Federal after having received death threats. 

In 2022 Salabert and Erika Hilton became the first two openly transgender people elected to the National Congress of Brazil, with both of them elected to its Chamber of Deputies.

Notes

References 

Year of birth missing (living people)
Date of birth missing (living people)
Living people
Minas Gerais politicians
Democratic Labour Party (Brazil) politicians
Travestis
Transgender politicians
Transgender women
21st-century Brazilian educators
Brazilian environmentalists
Brazilian LGBT politicians
21st-century Brazilian LGBT people
21st-century Brazilian women politicians
1981 births
Brazilian transgender people
Brazilian lesbians
Lesbian politicians